Unit 621, otherwise known as Egoz (Yehidat Egoz. lit. "Nut"), is an elite Israel Defense Forces (IDF) commando unit specializing in guerrilla warfare, special reconnaissance, and direct action (military). It is a part of the IDF Central Command's 89th Brigade (commonly referred to as the commando brigade).

Prior to 2000, Egoz operated mainly in Lebanon, combating threats from Hezbollah. Following Israel's withdrawal from Southern Lebanon, the unit shifted the focus of its operations to the West Bank and the Gaza Strip.

Service in Egoz 
Egoz recruits undergo basic and advanced infantry training with the Golani Brigade. Unit recruits then begin an intense 16 months training program to become Egoz special forces operators. One of the most rigorous and physically demanding training regimens in the Israel Defense Forces, Egoz prepares its soldiers for operations in multiple environments in and around Israel and the Palestinian Territories, including the West Bank and Gaza Strip, in addition to longer-range operations behind enemy lines in Lebanon and Syria. Egoz is a flexible and highly trained unit tasked with multiple missions that include irregular warfare, special reconnaissance, direct action, counter-terrorism, and joint special operations. Egoz missions are executed in small teams and are highly classified. The IDF does not disclose information on the unit or the operations in which the unit takes part in.

History 

Unit Egoz was named after the 1956 special forces reconnaissance unit known as (Sayeret) Egoz. Following a friendly-fire incident, Sayeret Egoz was disbanded, and then restored in 1964, when it continued to operate under the Northern Command. In 1974 it was disbanded once more due to manpower shortages following the Yom Kippur War.

Founded as a special forces counter-guerrilla unit in 1995 in order to counter Hezbollah operations in Southern Lebanon, Egoz was initially made up of one platoon from the Paratrooper's 5135th Reconnaissance Battalion. The unit's first commander was Erez Zuckerman, who spent much of his military career as a soldier and officer in the Israeli naval commando unit otherwise known as Shayetet 13. As a result, much of the discipline and tactics come from Shayetet 13, and are the foundations upon which the unit was built. Zuckerman led the unit in a series of counter-guerrilla operations in South Lebanon that resulted in a high number of Hezbollah operatives killed. In September 1996 Zuckerman commanded a force from the unit in an operation at Sujud ridge. The force encountered and killed three Hezbollah operatives while suffering two dead and several injured soldiers. The unit is credited with killing sixteen guerrillas in 1996.

In the 2006 Lebanon War, five Egoz operators were killed and six wounded in the Battle of Maroun al-Ras, following a direct hit by an AT-3 Sagger anti-tank missile. An estimated 13 members of Hezbollah were killed.

In Operation Protective Edge, three members of Unit Egoz were killed during unit operations in the Gaza Strip. On 21 July 2014, in the Shuja'iyya neighborhood of Gaza City, Egoz forces engaged and neutralized ten Hamas militants, including one that detonated a suicide vest.

Training

Egoz training is split into multiple phases:
 4 month basic and advanced infantry training within the Golani Brigade
2 weeks Airborne School
 10 months advanced Commando brigade training pipeline.

At the completion of the first phase, recruits begin a specialized training regimen in the Commando Brigade. Each Egoz recruit goes through extensive background checks and interviews by Israeli intelligence to determine whether or not they should be screened out of the second phase of training. Those that continue training with the unit begin an intensive ten-month Egoz training program. The training program in Egoz is known to be one of the toughest in the IDF, as can be explained by the notably high drop rate of recruits.

The Egoz training program is designed to bring recruits to their mental and physical limits in order to prepare them for their operational service. Among other things, the recruits train in extensive long-range navigation/orienteering, camouflage, reconnaissance, counter-terrorism, and various kinds of warfare and assaults. Egoz is one of a few units in the IDF that trains its recruits in long-range solo navigations. In addition to other highly classified unit-specific courses, every Egoz soldier completes the IDF commanders course.

References

Military units and formations of Israel
Northern Command (Israel)
Special forces of Israel
Counterterrorist organizations
Military units and formations established in 1956